Damien Roberts (born 26 January 1978) is a South African former professional tennis player.

Biography
Roberts went to Kearsney College until 1994, when he moved to the United States to train at the John Newcombe Tennis Academy in Texas. He attended New Braunfels High School.

As a junior, he was ranked as high as 11 in the world in doubles and was a finalist in the 1996 Wimbledon Championships with countryman Wesley Whitehouse.

From 1996 to 2001, Roberts competed professionally on the international tennis circuit, mostly in ATP Challenger tournaments. He won a total of five Challenger titles during his career, all in doubles.

Most notably he competed in the main draw of the 1999 Wimbledon Championships. He was eliminated in the opening round of qualifying in the singles and only narrowly missed qualification in the men's doubles, he and partner Amir Hadad lost the final qualifier in five sets. However the pair received a lucky loser entry into the main draw, where they lost in the first round to South Africans David Adams and John-Laffnie de Jager.

He appeared in the main draw of one ATP Tour event, the doubles at the 2001 Mercedes Cup in Stuttgart. Partnering Marcus Hilpert, they lost to Julian Knowle and Lorenzo Manta in the first round.

For many years after retiring he worked at the Lawn Tennis Association in England as the head of physical training and a national tennis coach. Due to his role with the Great Britain Fed Cup team and as national women's coach, he was also involved the development of Laura Robson and Heather Watson. He is now the Director of Performance Tennis at TennisGear in Brisbane, Australia.

Challenger titles

Doubles: (5)

References

External links
 
 

1978 births
Living people
South African male tennis players
Sportspeople from Durban
Sportspeople from New Braunfels, Texas
New Braunfels High School alumni
South African tennis coaches
South African expatriates in Australia
African Games medalists in tennis
African Games bronze medalists for South Africa
Competitors at the 1995 All-Africa Games
Alumni of Kearsney College